Ike Oguine is a Nigerian writer and lawyer. Oguine has been described as part of the third generation of Nigerian literature. As a commentator, he has written several opinion pieces for the New Internationalist, West Africa and Times Literary Supplement, and has written several short stories.

His first novel, A Squatter's Tale, was first published in 1997 and later republished as part of the Heinemann African Writers Series in 2000. 

Oguine's professional career is as a lawyer. First he worked for Chevron as the lead counsel on the West African Gas Pipeline, the Escravos GTL, the Brass LNG Project and the ONLNG project. From April 2014 to May 2015, he served as General Counsel to the Nigerian National Petroleum Corporation, under an appointment made by President Goodluck Jonathan.

References

External links
Ike Oguine's entry on AfricanWriter.com

Igbo writers
Nigerian writers
Year of birth missing (living people)
Living people